Catherine D'Ignazio (also known as kanarinka) is an American professor, artist, and software developer who focuses on feminism and data literacy. She is the director of the Data + Feminism lab at MIT. D'Ignazio is best known for her hackathons, such as "Make the Breast Pump Not Suck", and for her book Data Feminism, co-authored with Lauren Klein.

Early life and education
D'Ignazio was born in Chapel Hill, North Carolina and grew up in North Carolina, Virginia, Alabama, and Michigan. Her father, Fred D'Ignazio, is an American author, educator, and television commentator. D'Ignazio received her Bachelor of Arts (B.A.) degree in International Relations from Tufts University. She went on to receive a Master of Fine Arts (MFA) in Studio Art, Design and Theory from Maine College of Art and a Master of Science (M.S.) in Media Arts and Sciences from MIT in 2014.

Career
D'Ignazio works as an assistant professor at MIT and has published several works in her field of study as well as an acclaimed book, Data Feminism. She has organized several women's health hackathons, including "Make the Breast Pump Not Suck," which has now been featured in the Philadelphia Museum of Art's exhibition, Designs for Different Futures. She has also worked on news recommendation systems, and different types of data visualization.

D'Ignazio started to work in software development and taught for seven years in the Digital + Media graduate program at Rhode Island School of Design. She then moved on to work in the Journalism Department at Emerson College, as an Assistant Professor of Data Visualization and Civic Media. Having years of experience as a professor, she then became an Assistant Professor of Urban Science and Planning in the Department of Urban Studies and Planning at MIT. D'Ignazio maintains this role today, and also acts as the Director of the Data + Feminism Lab.

Works
 with Lauren Klein, Data Feminism (2020)
 edited with Nanna Bonde Thylstrup, Annie Ring, and Kristin Veel,  Uncertain Archives: Critical Keywords for Big Data (2020)

References 

Date of birth missing (living people)
Living people
21st-century American non-fiction writers
American feminist writers
American software engineers
People from Chapel Hill, North Carolina
Tufts University alumni
Maine College of Art alumni
Massachusetts Institute of Technology alumni
MIT School of Architecture and Planning faculty
Rhode Island School of Design faculty
Emerson College faculty
Year of birth missing (living people)